Anatoly Skavronsky (born 1940) is a retired Soviet swimmer who won a bronze medal in the 200 m butterfly event at the 1966 European Aquatics Championships.

References

1940 births
Living people
Ukrainian male swimmers
Male butterfly swimmers
Soviet male swimmers
European Aquatics Championships medalists in swimming
Sportspeople from Kyiv